The four-star Steigenberger Cecil Hotel in Alexandria, Egypt, was built as the Cecil Hotel in 1929 by the French-Egyptian Jewish Metzger family as a romantic hotel, at Saad Zaghloul square where Cleopatra's needles had been, in front of the Corniche.  Author Somerset Maugham stayed here, as did Winston Churchill and Al Capone. Moreover, the British Secret Service maintained a suite for their operations.  It was seized by the Egyptian government after the revolution in 1952, and five years later the Metzger family was expelled from the country. In 2007, after a lengthy court battle, legal ownership of the hotel was returned to the Metzger family, who subsequently sold it to the Egyptian government. This hotel appears in The Alexandria Quartet, written by Lawrence Durrell and the novel Miramar by Naguib Mahfuz. The hotel operated for many years as the Sofitel Cecil Alexandria Hotel, until it joined the Steigenberger Hotels chain in October, 2014.

References

External links
 Official website

Hotels in Alexandria
Hotels established in 1929
Hotel buildings completed in 1929